Sherko, also Şêrko, is a Kurdish given name for males and may refer to:

 Asad Ad-Din Sherko, a Kurdish General of Zengid army and uncle of Saladin 
 Sherko Bekas (born 1940), Kurdish poet
 Sherko Haji-Rasouli (born 1980), Canadian football player from Iran
 Sherko Moarefi, Kurdish-Iranian activist
 Sherko Karim, Iraqi-Kurdish footballer